The flags of the provinces of the Philippines are the vexillological devices used by various provincial-level local government units (LGUs) of the country.

Designs
The most common provincial flag design is a plain field of a single color with the provincial seal placed in the center; of this design the most prevalent field color used is white, followed by shades of yellow, of green and of blue. Some of these plain flags have additional text above and/or below the seal, usually involving the province name.

Several provincial flags deviate from the default design: some are horizontal or vertical tribands, usually employing three different colors (i.e., a tricolor); some also use charges derived from elements within provincial seals, instead of using the entire provincial seal.

Usage
Most of the provincial flags, by virtue of bearing the corporate seal of the LGU, are solely intended to represent the provincial government wherever they are displayed, and not meant to be adopted by the public for general use. Such government flags only find usage within provincial government premises (e.g., provincial capitol grounds;  provincial government office spaces such as that of the governor; Sangguniang Panlalawigan chambers; or provincially-owned sports or recreational facilities) and are most visible to the public during events involving the provincial government. The designs of many of these government flags can be easily changed between administrations, especially when the provincial seal itself is altered (e.g., Ilocos Norte; Marinduque); at times they reflect the personal preferences of the provincial governor in power (e.g., use of the blue flag for Laguna during the term of Emilio Ejercito from 2010 to 2014; use of "Oriental Negros" in the provincial flag and seal during the term of George Arnaiz from 2004 to 2007).

The flags of some provinces have provincial board (PB) or Sangguniang Panlalawigan (SP) resolutions or ordinances specifying their designs and specifications; therefore the modification of these flags will require amending or repealing previous legal enactments made by the provincial legislative body. Some flags with legally specified designs, such as those of Bohol, Bukidnon and Southern Leyte, are allowed to be adopted by the general public as a symbol of civic pride for the province, and thus serve dual purpose as both a government and a civic flag.

At least two provinces — Camarines Norte and South Cotabato — maintain two vastly different official flag designs: one for exclusive government use (i.e., a plain white flag with the provincial seal in the center) and another for civic use.

List of current provincial flags

See also
 List of flags of the Philippines
 Provinces of the Philippines

External links
 Symbols of the State – digitized copy of book published by the Bureau of Local Government in 1975, containing standardized flag drawings for Philippine provinces, sub-provinces, and chartered cities
 Philippines Provincial Flags – digitized renderings of provincial flags from the 1975 Symbols of the State Book. Almost all of the flags depicted here have been replaced with newer versions.

References

Philippine provinces
Provinces
 
Philippines
Flags